The women's 100 metres event at the 2005 European Athletics U23 Championships was held in Erfurt, Germany, at Steigerwaldstadion on 14 and 16 July.

Medalists

Results

Final
16 July
Wind: 1.5m/s

Heats
14 July
Qualified: first 2 in each heat and 2 best to the Final

Heat 1
Wind: -1.3m/s

Heat 2
Wind: -1.2m/s

Heat 3
Wind: -1.7m/s

Participation
According to an unofficial count, 19 athletes from 15 countries participated in the event.

 (1)
 (1)
 (1)
 (1)
 (1)
 (3)
 (2)
 (1)
 (1)
 (1)
 (2)
 (1)
 (1)
 (1)
 (1)

References

100 metres
100 metres at the European Athletics U23 Championships